Ruppia drepanensis is a species of plant in the family Ruppiaceae.

Sources

References 

drepanensis
Flora of Malta